Jeanne Herry (born 19 April 1978) is a French filmmaker and actress.

Personal life
She is the daughter of actress Miou-Miou and singer-songwriter Julien Clerc.

Filmography

References

External links 

1978 births
Living people
French film actresses
French film directors
French women screenwriters
20th-century French actresses
French women film directors